The Metropolis of Bessarabia, also referred to as the Bessarabian Orthodox Church, is an autonomous Eastern Orthodox Metropolitan bishopric of the Romanian Orthodox Church, situated in Moldova. Its canonical jurisdiction is the territory of the Republic of Moldova, and over the Moldovan and Romanian Orthodox diaspora from the former USSR.

The Metropolis of Bessarabia was created in 1918, as the Archbishopric of Chișinău, and organized as a Metropolis, in 1927. Inactive during the Soviet occupation of Bessarabia (1940–1941) and the Soviet rule in Moldova (1944–1991), the Metropolis of Bessarabia was re-activated on 14 September 1992, and raised to the rank of exarchate, in 1995. The current Metropolitan of Bessarabia is Petru (Păduraru).

History

In 1812, after the annexation of Bessarabia by the Russian Empire, the Orthodox churches were re-organized as the Eparchy of Chişinău and Hotin, from the churches and monasteries of the Metropolis of Moldavia on that territory that no longer belonged to the Principality of Moldavia, by Gavril Bănulescu-Bodoni, a popular promoter of Moldavian/Romanian language and culture, who also served as its first Archbishop. After 1821, the Russian state and church started an extended policy of Russification.

In 1858, after southern Bessarabia was returned to Moldavia, which soon united with Wallachia to form Romania, the Orthodox churches in Cahul, Bolgrad, and Ismail re-entered under the Romanian Church jurisdiction of the Metropolis of Moldavia, which established the Diocese of the Lower Danube, in 1864. In 1878, after Russia re-annexed southern Bessarabia, the Russian Church jurisdiction was reinstated.

In 1918, after the Union of Bessarabia with Romania, the archbishop Anastasius Gribanovsky of the Eparchy of Chişinău was ousted after he refused to accede to Romania's demand to secede from the Russian Orthodox Church and integrate the eparchy in the Romanian one. With the advent of Greater Romania in 1918, there were three church bodies: the autocephalous Romanian Orthodox Church (on the territory of  Smaller Romania—prior to 1918—formed in 1872 from the union of the Metropolis of Ungrovlahia with Metropolis of Moldavia), and the non-autocephalous Metropolis of Bessarabia and Metropolis of Transylvania. Therefore, in 1925, the rank of the Romanian Orthodox Church was raised to that of a Patriarchate, with the Metropolis of Bessarabia as one of its five sees. Gurie Grosu was the first Metropolitan of Bessarabia, and Efrem Enăchescu the second.

After the Soviet occupation of Bessarabia in 1940, the church, which then was a non-autonomous Metropolis, was banned, and its property has either changed uses, or was transferred to the Russian Orthodox Church, which established the Bishopric in Chişinău and Moldova. In 1980s, two more bishoprics were added, and the See raised to the status of the Archdiocese, in 1990, and as the Metropolis of Chișinău and All Moldova, in 1992.

After Moldova's independence in 1991, part of the clergy followed Petru Păduraru, the Bishop of Bălţi, and re-established the Metropolis of Bessarabia. The Romanian Orthodox Church considered that, during the time, the Russian Orthodox Church jurisdiction on the former territory of Bessarabia was an unfair and abusive act in terms of historical reality and canon law, and as long as it remains under the Russian Orthodox Church, the jurisdiction right of the Metropolis of Chișinău and All Moldova can be exercised only to the Russian ethnics of Moldova.

The Russian Orthodox Church also refused to recognize the authority of the Bessarabian church, and the two metropolia started an uneasy co-existence. During the 1990s, the one subordinated to the Russian Orthodox Church gained the protection of the country's authorities and established itself as the official church, while the Orthodox Church of Bessarabia was refused registration according to the country's new law of religions. In 2004, after years of legal hurdles and a final decision by the European Court of Human Rights, the Orthodox Church of Bessarabia received official registration, the Supreme Court of Justice of the Republic of Moldova recognizing it as "the spiritual, canonical, historical successor of the Metropolitan See of Bessarabia which functioned till 1944, including". About 20% of country's Orthodox churches were or changed to be under its jurisdictions; a strong desire to similar moves has been expressed in many other parishes.

This decision continues to be a major area of tension with the Russian Orthodox Church. The position of the Romanian Orthodox Church in the dispute with the Russian Orthodox Church over the territorial jurisdiction is, according to a press release, that the two Metropolitan Sees should "peacefully co-exist and brotherly cooperate (…) harmonising, with wisdom and realism, the territorial principle with the ethnic principle, as agreed in the pastoral service of the Orthodox in Diaspora."

Structure and organization
The church is currently recognized only by some other Orthodox Churches, since the Patriarchate of Moscow opposes its recognition by all of them. The current Metropolitan of Bessarabia is Petru Păduraru (born 24 October 1946 in Ţiganca, elected as metropolitan in 1992), and it has about one third of the orthodox community in Moldova.

The Metropolis of Bessarabia consists of four eparchies:
Archdiocese of Chișinău
Diocese of Bălți
Diocese of Southern Bessarabia
Diocese of Dubăsari and Transnistria

See also
History of the Orthodox Church in Moldova
Religion in Moldova
List of members of the Holy Synod of the Romanian Orthodox Church
Metropolis of Moldavia and Bukovina
St. Teodora de la Sihla Church 
Luminătorul 
Misionarul

Gallery

References

External links
Official website 
Website 
Liberté de la Métropolie de la Béssarabie
Freedom of the Metropolis of Bessarabia
DECLARATION ECRITE N° 265 concernant l'arrêt de la Cour d'Appel de la République de Moldova relatif à la légitimité et à la liberté de la Métropolie de Bessarabie
WRITTEN DECLARATION No. 265 on the decision of the Court of Appeal of the Republic of Moldova on the legitimacy and freedom of the Metropolis of Bessarabia
Droit de l'Eglise métropolitaine de Bessarabie à sa propre succession juridique
Right of the Metropolitan Church of Bessarabia to its own succession in title
Complicité de la Patriarchie de Moscou et de toute la Russie avec le régime illégale et sécessioniste installé à l'Est de la République de Moldova
Complicity of the Patriarch of Moscow and all Russia with the illegal and secessionist regime installed in the east of the Moldovan Republic
Statement concerning the arguments of the representatives of the Romanian Orthodox Church justifying the decision to establish dioceses of the Metropolia of Bessarabia
Territorial Jurisdiction According to Orthodox Canon Law. The Phenomenon of Ethnophyletism in Recent Years, a paper read at the International Congress of Canon Law, 2001, (Ecumenical Patriarchate website)
Torna a Patriarcato di Mosca 

 
Eastern Orthodoxy in Moldova
Christian organizations established in 1918